Fair Ain't Fair is Tim Fite's second studio album released on ANTI- Records.  As with Gone Ain't Gone, Fite created this album with a mixture of real instrumentation and sampling, resulting in a sound composed of rock, folk and hip hop elements.

Franz Nicolay, of The Hold Steady, listed the album among his favourite albums of 2008.

Track listing
All songs written by T. Sullivan, except "Harriet Tubman" (T. Sullivan/C. Lind)

"Roots of a Tree" (1:54)
"Trouble" (3:26)
"The Barber" (3:25)
"Big Mistake" (3:28)
"Inside Man" (2:02)
"Rats and Rags" (3:25)
"Yesterday's Garden" (3:14)
"Thought I Was a Gun" (2:03)
"The Names of All the Animals" (4:24)
"Motorcade" (1:37)
"More Clothes" (3:28)
"Harriet Tubman" (1:36)
"My Hands" (4:00)
"Heaven Is War" (1:46)
"Sing Along" (3:29)
"Line by Line" (3:26)

Samples
"Roots of a Tree" samples the song "Kettle" by Frances
"Trouble" samples the song "When We Were Wolves" by My Latest Novel
"The Barber" samples the song "Spin Me Around" by Kip Boardman
"Big Mistake" samples the song "Kitty and Her Beautiful Lady" by Remate
"Motorcade" samples the song "Black Holes" by Needle
"Yesterday's Garden" samples the song "Whistle and Water" by East Ghost West Ghost
"More Clothes" samples the song "Bubbles" by Trunk Federation
"My Hands" samples the song "I Can't Fall Asleep" by Picastro
"Sing Along" samples the song "Poison" by Constantines

Major contributors
Dr. Leisure – Tape sounds, singing, live show
Rob Bedenoch – Engineering, audio tweaking
Justin Riddle – Drums, percussion
Shawna Enyart – Elephants
Chris Lind – Slack key guitar
Andy, Matt, and Anti – Business
Jacob Harris – Management
Dan Kinsley – Guitar, piano, mandolin
Ryan Foregger – Video specialization
Adam Gustavson – Guitar, banjo, pedal steel, bass
Dan Saks – Guitar
Merle Hansen – Viola
Pepi Ginsberg – singing
Shars Worden – singing, ghosting
The Bloody Nose Boys – singing
Danielle Stech Homsy – singing
Dave Kutch – Mastering
Tim Fite – Everything else and nothing else

References

External links
Fair Ain't Fair on ANTI- Records' website

2008 albums
Tim Fite albums
Anti- (record label) albums